The 1906 Mid Cork by-election was held on 31 December. The by-election was held due to the resignation of the incumbent MP, D. D. Sheehan, who had been expelled from the Irish Parliamentary Party. Sheehan ran as Independent Labour and was elected unopposed. He remained as MP for the constituency until 1918.

References

By-elections to the Parliament of the United Kingdom in County Cork constituencies
1906 elections in the United Kingdom
Unopposed by-elections to the Parliament of the United Kingdom in Irish constituencies
1906 elections in Ireland